The Fredrick C. Hobdy Assembly Center  is a 7,500-seat multi-purpose arena in Grambling, Louisiana. It is home to the Grambling State University Tigers basketball team, along with Memorial Gymnasium. The arena also hosts concerts and events. It is named after former Tiger head basketball coach, Fred Hobdy.

The arena opened in 2007 and was first used as the location of funeral services for former Grambling State football coach, Eddie Robinson.

See also
 List of NCAA Division I basketball arenas
 List of music venues

References

External links
Hobdy Assembly Center Ribbon Cutting

Grambling State Tigers men's basketball
Grambling State Tigers women's basketball
Basketball venues in Louisiana
College basketball venues in the United States
Sports venues in Grambling, Louisiana
Sports venues in Louisiana
Indoor arenas in Louisiana
Music venues in Louisiana